Bogotol is a town in Krasnoyarsk Krai, Russia, located  of the Chulym River and  west of Krasnoyarsk, the administrative center of the krai. Population:

History
It was founded in 1893 due to the construction of the Trans-Siberian Railway. The name derives from the Ket words bogotu (one of the Ket tribes in the area) and ul (river). Bogotol was granted town status in 1911.

Administrative and municipal status
Within the framework of administrative divisions, Bogotol serves as the administrative center of Bogotolsky District, even though it is not a part of it. As an administrative division, it is incorporated separately as the krai town of Bogotol—an administrative unit with the status equal to that of the districts. As a municipal division, the krai town of Bogotol is incorporated as Bogotol Urban Okrug.

References

Notes

Sources

External links
Official website of Bogotol 
Bogotol Business Directory 

Cities and towns in Krasnoyarsk Krai